Laus Omar Mhina (born 1 October 1952) is a Tanzanian CCM politician and Member of Parliament for Korogwe Vijijini constituency in the National Assembly of Tanzania since 2005.

References

Living people
Chama Cha Mapinduzi MPs
Tanzanian MPs 2005–2010
1952 births
Place of birth missing (living people)